Come Into the World is the debut single album by South Korean boy band Teen Top. It was released on July 9, 2010 with the song "Clap" as a promotional track. The album was re-released on July 11, 2013 with additional unseen photos titled as Come into the World: Clap Encore.

Track listing

Charts

Album

Original release

Clap Encore

Singles

Sales and certifications

References

External links
 Official Teen Top website

2010 debut albums
Single albums
Teen Top albums